Kung Fu Records is an American independent record label founded in 1996 by Joe Escalante and Warren Fitzgerald of the punk rock band The Vandals. Founded in order to release a record by the Riverside, California band Assorted Jelly Beans, the label soon grew to include a roster of notable artists such as The Ataris, Ozma, Tsunami Bomb, and The Vandals themselves. In 2000 Escalante started Kung Fu Films as a subsidiary of the music label in order to release DVDs of live concerts, music videos, band documentaries, and independent films. In 2005 Kung Fu also spawned the spinoff label Broken Sounds Records, focusing on hardcore releases.

History
Kung Fu Records was founded by Vandals bassist Joe Escalante and guitarist Warren Fitzgerald in 1996. Escalante had been urged by his wife to allow the Riverside, California band Assorted Jelly Beans to open for The Vandals, and he and Fitzgerald were so impressed by their performance that they decided to start a record label in order to release the band's debut album.

In 2010, the label and the band Vandals were sued by Daily Variety stating it violated an agreement stemming from a complaint Variety registered in 2004 over the design of the Vandals’ “Hollywood Potato Chip” album cover, looking like the Variety logo. The label won the first round and the case was sent from Delaware to the California courts. The case was finally settled in 2012.

Offshoots and subsidiary labels
Kung Fu records has also spawned several subsidiary imprints specializing in particular types of releases. In 2000 Escalante started Kung Fu Films as an offshoot of the label with the release of the independent film That Darn Punk, in which he starred. The label also released the internet television series Fear of a Punk Planet, which was later released on DVD. Over the years Kung Fu Films has released more independent films, such as 2005's Cake Boy starring Fitzgerald, and several video compilations showcasing bands from the Kung Fu labels. The film imprint is best known, however, for its series of live concert DVDs grouped under the title The Show Must Go Off! To date there have been 19 "episodes" of the series released. These have included bands signed to Kung Fu Records such as The Vandals and Tsunami Bomb, but more often have branched outside the label to include groups such as Alkaline Trio, Guttermouth, Reel Big Fish, the Circle Jerks, and The Bouncing Souls.

In 2005 Kung Fu Records launched the spinoff imprint Broken Sounds Records to focus on releases by hardcore acts such as the Righteous Jams, The Getaway, xdeathstarx, Suffocate Faster, and H2O. To date, however, the only album to be released under the Broken Sounds imprint has been the Righteous Jams' Rage of Discipline.

Artists
Antifreeze
Apocalypse Hoboken
Assorted Jelly Beans
The Ataris
Audio Karate
Bouncing Souls
Down by Law
Josh Freese
Kenneth Keith Kallenbach
Knock-Out
Longfellow
The God Awfuls
Sweet and Tender Hooligans
Ozma
Mi6
Tsunami Bomb
Underminded
Useless ID
The Vandals
Versus the World

Notable one-time releases
blink-182
MxPx
The Chinkees
Bigwig

Label compilations
Much like other independent record labels, Kung Fu has released a series of low-priced compilation samplers designed to draw attention to the label. Originally these compilations did not have a unifying title similar to Epitaph's Punk-O-Rama or Fat's Fat Music series. However the third sampler was titled Punk Rock is Your Friend, and this became the series' overall name. Future compilations were released as Punk Rock is Your Friend: Kung Fu Records Sampler #_, the first such release being #4 even though the first two did not carry the Punk Rock is Your Friend title.

CD samplers

Video samplers

See also
Kung Fu Films
Broken Sounds Records
Joe Escalante
Warren Fitzgerald
List of record labels

References

External links
Official website

American independent record labels
 
Alternative rock record labels
Punk record labels
Record labels based in California
Companies based in Orange County, California
Seal Beach, California
Record labels established in 1996
1996 establishments in California